Upholland railway station serves the small town of Up Holland in the southern Lancashire/Wigan boundary area of England.

Upholland has been named in past Lancashire County Council reports as a possible site of a rail link to Skelmersdale, but as yet no firm plans have been made.

History

The original Upholland station was on a different site, opened by the Liverpool and Bury Railway on 20 November 1848, but closed four years later in 1852. The current station was originally called "Pimbo Lane Station", and also opened on 20 November 1848. It was renamed "Up Holland" on 13 October 1900, and "Upholland" in 1902.

Facilities
The station is unstaffed and has no permanent buildings left, other than basic shelters on each platform.  Timetable posters provide train running information.  Step-free access is available to the eastbound platform (via a steep ramp), but not for the westbound one (this can only be reached by a staircase from Pimbo Lane). The station also has a small car park located next to the bridge on Pimbo Lane.

Service 
Upholland is served by one train per hour in each direction, towards  to the west, and Blackburn to the east via Manchester Victoria and Rochdale.

There is no late evening service after 20:01 and no service on a Sunday. A normal service runs on most Bank holidays.

In the future, Upholland could be served by regular Merseyrail services, if the plan for battery-powered Class 777's to take over the line goes ahead.

Notes

External links 

Railway stations in the Borough of West Lancashire
DfT Category F2 stations
Former Lancashire and Yorkshire Railway stations
Northern franchise railway stations
Railway stations in Great Britain opened in 1848